Sagittranstilla is a genus of moths belonging to the family Tortricidae.

Species
Sagittranstilla mageana Razowski & Becker, 1999

See also
List of Tortricidae genera

References

 , 1999: Descriptions of new Neotropical Euliini genera (Lepidoptera: Tortricidae) and their species. Polskie Pismo Entomologiczne, Polish Journal of Entomology 68 (4): 407–414.

External links
Tortricid.net

Euliini
Tortricidae genera